Carraig Airt (anglicised as Carrigart or Carrickart) is a small Gaeltacht village in the barony of Kilmacrennan to the north of County Donegal, Ireland.
The village is on the R245 route between Letterkenny and Creeslough. Situated as it is at the base of the Rosguill peninsula, in one of the more remote but most scenic parts of the country, the village provides services for a large hinterland, with a supermarket with banking facilities, a post office, a doctor's surgery and a barracks staffed part-time by the Garda Síochána. Carrigart has a public park that borders the shoreline behind the houses on the main street.  Designed by Angela Gallagher, it is maintained by the Tidy Towns Committee and has won several awards. The village and its environs remain largely agricultural, relying on passing trade and tourism during the summer months. In common with the rest of this part of Donegal, Carrigart has many second homes, owned especially by Northern Irish holiday makers.

The village, which celebrated its centenary in 2002, although there is evidence of Carrigart's existence for longer than that, originally formed part of the estates of the Earls of Leitrim, nearby Mulroy House being one of their seats. William Clements, 3rd Earl of Leitrim, was assassinated in nearby Cratlagh wood in 1878 by men from the neighbouring peninsula of Fanad.

In the 18th and 19th centuries, Carrigart had a fair day on 21 June. The town now hosts a festival that runs from 8 to 14 August.

The official name given to Carrigart is Carraig Airt but it has also been translated as Ceathrú Fhiodhghoirt, meaning Quarterland of the Wood of the Field

See also
 List of populated places in Ireland

References

Articles on towns and villages in Ireland possibly missing Irish place names
Gaeltacht places in County Donegal
Gaeltacht towns and villages
Towns and villages in County Donegal